The 1979–80 Chicago Black Hawks season was the 54th season of operation of the Chicago Black Hawks in the National Hockey League.  The club was coming off a first-place finish in the Smythe Division in the 1978–79, despite finishing with a 29-36-15 record.  In the 1979 playoffs, the Black Hawks were swept by the New York Islanders in the quarter-finals.

Off-season
During the off-season, the Black Hawks named Eddie Johnston as their new head coach, as Bob Pulford stepped down to focus on his general manager duties.  Johnston was previously the head coach of the New Brunswick Hawks, Chicago's AHL affiliate, in 1978–79, leading the team to a 41-29-10 record.  Johnston was also a former goaltender, playing in the NHL from 1962-1978, earning a 234-257-80 record with a 3.25 GAA in 592 career games while playing for the Boston Bruins, Toronto Maple Leafs, St. Louis Blues and the Chicago Black Hawks.  Johnston won two Stanley Cup championships with the Bruins in 1970 and 1972.

With the NHL expanding to 21 teams, as the Edmonton Oilers, Hartford Whalers, Quebec Nordiques and Winnipeg Jets joined the league from the WHA, the Hawks remained in the Smythe Division, with the Oilers and Jets joining Chicago, Colorado Rockies, St. Louis Blues and Vancouver Canucks to form the only six team division in the league.

At the 1979 NHL Expansion Draft, Chicago made a deal with the Quebec Nordiques, as the Hawks agreed to not reclaim Real Cloutier from the Nordiques in exchange for Quebec's first round draft pick in the 1980 NHL Entry Draft.  Prior to the draft, the Hawks reclaimed Bobby Hull and Terry Ruskowski from the Winnipeg Jets and John Garrett from the Hartford Whalers.  During the draft, Chicago lost Hull to Winnipeg, Garrett and Jean Savard to the Whalers, Doug Hicks and Reg Thomas to the Edmonton Oilers.  The Hawks added Rich Preston from the Jets at the draft.

Regular season
Keith Magnuson retired three games into the season, and was replaced by Terry Ruskowski as team captain.

On October 10, 1979, Chicago beat Edmonton 4-2. This was also the debut of future Hall of Famer Wayne Gretzky.

The Black Hawks had a poor start to the season, as they club had a record of 3-6-3 in their first 12 games. The club continued to struggle, as Chicago won only eight of their first 29 games, going 8-11-10, however, the Hawks were in second place in the Smythe Division, five points behind the first place Vancouver Canucks.  The Hawks then went 9-3-2 in their next 14 games, improving their overall record to 17-14-12, charging into first place, five points ahead of the second place St. Louis Blues.  Chicago would hold on to first place for the rest of the season, finishing with a 34-27-19 record, earning 87 points, for their third consecutive division title, and eighth in the last eleven seasons.

Offensively, the club was led by Terry Ruskowski, who joined the Black Hawks after being reclaimed in the 1979 NHL Expansion Draft by the team from the Winnipeg Jets, as he had a team high 70 points, scoring 15 goals and 55 assists.  He also led the club with 252 penalty minutes.  Tom Lysiak finished second in team scoring with 26 goals and 69 points, while Grant Mulvey had a team high 39 goals, while adding 26 assists for 65 points.  Rich Preston also broke the 30 goal plateau, as he had 31 goals and 61 points and had a team best +16 rating.  On defence, Doug Wilson led the way with 12 goals and 61 points, while Bob Murray had another excellent season, scoring 16 goals and 50 points.

In goal, Tony Esposito saw the majority of playing time, going 31-22-16 with a 2.97 GAA in 69 games.

Final standings

Playoffs
The Black Hawks opened the playoffs with a best-of-five preliminary series against the St. Louis Blues.  The Blues finished the season with a 34-34-12 record, earning 80 points and second place in the Smythe Division, seven points behind Chicago.  The series opened with two games at Chicago Stadium.  The first game would be decided in overtime, after the clubs played to a 2-2 tie after regulation time.  In the extra period, the Hawks Doug Lecuyer scored and ended the Black Hawks 16 game playoff game losing streak, as Chicago took the series opener by a 3-2 score.  It marked the first time since 1975 that Chicago had won a playoff game.  In the second game, the Hawks, led by Doug Wilson and his two goals, easily defeated the Blues 5-1 to take a 2-0 series lead.  The series shifted to The Checkerdome in St. Louis, Missouri for the third game, and the Hawks, led by Doug Lecuyer and his two goals, as well as 23 saves by goaltender Tony Esposito, completed the series sweep.

In the NHL quarter-finals, the Black Hawks faced the Buffalo Sabres.  Buffalo finished the season with a 47-17-16 record, earning 110 points and first place in the Adams Division.  The Sabres then defeated the Vancouver Canucks three games to one in the first round of the playoffs.  The series opened with two games at the Buffalo Memorial Auditorium in Buffalo, New York, as the Sabres easily defeated the Black Hawks 5-0 in the series opener, limiting Chicago to only one shot in the first period, and 17 overall.  In the second game, the Sabres took an early 2-0 lead in the first period, however, two straight goals by Tom Lysiak tied the game early in the second period.  The Sabres then struck for three straight goals before Chicago could answer with one of their own to take a 5-3 lead into the third period.  The Black Hawks cut the Sabres lead to 5-4 when Darryl Sutter scored early in the third, however, the Sabres shut down the Hawks, and won the game 6-4 to take a 2-0 series lead.  The series moved to Chicago Stadium for the next two games, and in the third game, the Sabres once again scored two early goals in the first period to take a 2-0 lead.  Darryl Sutter cut the Sabres lead in half in the second period, as the Hawks made the score 2-1, however, Sabres goaltender Don Edwards made 38 saves, as Buffalo held on for a 2-1 victory, and taking a 3-0 series lead.  In the fourth game, the Black Hawks took their first lead in the series when Bob Murray scored midway through the first period to give Chicago a 1-0 lead.  Tom Lysiak made it 2-0 Chicago in the second period, however, the Sabres John Van Boxmeer cut the Hawks lead to 2-1 with a goal late in the second period.  Buffalo completed the comeback with two unanswered goals in the third period, one by Rick Martin and one by Gilbert Perreault, as the Sabres won the game 3-2, and swept the series.

Schedule and results

Chicago Black Hawks 3, St. Louis Blues 0

Buffalo Sabres 4, Chicago Black Hawks 0

Player statistics

Regular season
Scoring

Goaltending

Playoffs
Scoring

Goaltending

Note: Pos = Position; GP = Games played; G = Goals; A = Assists; Pts = Points; +/- = plus/minus; PIM = Penalty minutes; PPG = Power-play goals; SHG = Short-handed goals; GWG = Game-winning goals
      MIN = Minutes played; W = Wins; L = Losses; T = Ties; GA = Goals-against; GAA = Goals-against average; SO = Shutouts;

Awards and records

Transactions

Draft picks
Chicago's draft picks at the 1979 NHL Entry Draft held at the Queen Elizabeth Hotel in Montreal, Quebec.

Farm teams

See also
1979–80 NHL season

References

 

Chicago Blackhawks seasons
Chicago Blackhawks
Chicago Blackhawks
Smythe Division champion seasons
1979 in Illinois
Chicago